Tau Aurigae, Latinized from τ Aurigae, is a star in the northern constellation Auriga. It is visible to the naked eye with an apparent visual magnitude of 4.505, and is approximately  distant from Earth.

Tau Aurigae is an evolved giant star with a stellar classification of G8 III. It has expanded to 11 times the radius of the Sun and shines with 63 times the Sun's luminosity. This energy is radiated into outer space from the outer atmosphere at an effective temperature of 4,887. This heat gives it the yellow-hued glow of a G-type star.

References

External links
 HR 1995
 CCDM J05492+3911
 Image Tau Aurigae

038656
001995
Aurigae, Tau
Auriga (constellation)
G-type giants
Aurigae, 29
1995
BD+39 1418